Marinobacter sediminum is a marine, Gram-negative, aerobic and halophilic bacteria with type strain KMM 3657T (=R65T =DSM 15400T).

References

Further reading

External links
LPSN
Type strain of Marinobacter sediminum at BacDive -  the Bacterial Diversity Metadatabase

Alteromonadales
Bacteria described in 2005
Halophiles